The Monk's Bay Sandstone, formerly known as the Carstone Formation of the Isle of Wight (or similar) is a geological formation in England, present on the Isle of Wight and marginally in Swanage. Its lithology consists of gritty, reddish-brown sands with pebbles and phosphatic nodules

References 

Geologic formations of England
Albian Stage
Geology of Dorset
Lower Cretaceous Series of Europe